Finery is a British womenswear fashion label, which products are available for purchase online and via selected offline stockists. Its approach is to offer smaller collections for women, not girls, that are “moderately priced”, well-styled, and versatile.

The company was founded in March 2014 by Nickyl Raithatha, Luca Marini and Caren Downie.  Raithatha and Marini, who knew each other from business school, had the idea for a clothing brand while Raithatha was working for Rocket Internet and Marini was a director at one of Rocket's fashion e-tailers. They recruited Caren Downie, who had formerly been ASOS.com's fashion director and Topshop's buying director.  Downie, in turn, recruited her former colleagues Emma Farrow and Rachel Morgans for design.

After obtaining initial funding from Rocket, Finery launched in February 2015 with a 150-piece collection, priced between £19 for a jersey top and £345 for a leather jacket. To celebrate the launch of the website, in February 2015 Finery opened a pop-up store in Covent Garden.

References

Further reading

External links 
 

Clothing brands of the United Kingdom
Online clothing retailers of the United Kingdom
Clothing companies based in London
British companies established in 2014
Clothing companies established in 2014
Retail companies established in 2014
2014 establishments in England